Hermodice is a genus of annelids belonging to the family Amphinomidae.

The genus has almost cosmopolitan distribution.

Species:

Hermodice carunculata 
Hermodice picta 
Hermodice sanguinea 
Hermodice savignyi 
Hermodice smaragdina

References

Annelids